Agios Minas may refer to:
Agios Minas, a municipality in Chios
Agios Minas (island), an island in Aegean
Agios Minas, Ioannina, a village in Ioannina prefecture